Roland Morris "Fatty" Taylor (March 13, 1946 – December 7, 2017) was an American professional basketball player.  A 6’0" guard born in Washington, D.C. and an alum of La Salle University, Taylor joined the American Basketball Association in 1969.  After one year playing for the Washington Capitals, he moved on to the Virginia Squires, with whom he spent the prime of his career, tallying 3,495 points, 1,737 assists, and 1,715 rebounds in five seasons.  Taylor became known as one of the few outstanding defensive players in a league known primarily for a "run-and-gun" style.  On the Squires Taylor played with former or later NBA stars including Adrian Smith, "Jumbo" Jim Eakins and Julius "Doctor J" Erving.  For one-and-a-half seasons Taylor was a teammate of George Gervin, and Taylor has been credited with coining Gervin's nickname "The Iceman" (he first called Gervin "Iceberg Slim", which gradually developed into the more familiar nickname).  Taylor spent one season in the NBA (1976–77) as a member of the Denver Nuggets, and he retired in 1977 with combined ABA/NBA totals of 5,098 points, 2,563 assists, and 2,524 rebounds.

Cancer and death 
In 2000, Taylor was diagnosed with male breast cancer after his doctor's fill-in found that one of his nipples was inverted. One day after being diagnosed, Taylor went into surgery and ended up having a mastectomy. In 2011, he was found to have many blood clots in his chest and that the cancer had recurred in his lungs and bones, which Taylor had treatment for soon after. In July 2015, he found that cancer had spread into his pelvis and he had many complications afterward.

Fatty Taylor died from the complications on December 7, 2017 at the age of 71.

References

External links
Career stats

1946 births
2017 deaths
African-American basketball players
Basketball players from Washington, D.C.
Deaths from male breast cancer
Deaths from cancer in Colorado
Denver Nuggets players
Dodge City Conquistadors basketball players
La Salle Explorers men's basketball players
Philadelphia 76ers draft picks
Point guards
Virginia Squires players
Washington Caps players
American men's basketball players
20th-century African-American sportspeople
21st-century African-American people